{{Infobox philosopher
| region = Western philosophy
| era = 20th-century philosophy
| image = Gaston Bachelard 1965.jpg
| caption = 
| name = Gaston Bachelard
| birth_date       = 
| birth_place      = Bar-sur-Aube, France
| death_date       = 
| death_place      = Paris, France
| education        = University of Paris(B.A., 1920; D.-ès-Lettres, 1927)
| institutions     = University of Dijon<ref>Routledge Encyclopedia of Philosophy (1998): "Bachelard, Gaston (1884-1962)".</ref>University of Paris
| school_tradition = Continental philosophyFrench historical epistemology
| doctoral_advisor = Abel ReyLéon Brunschvicg
| main_interests   = Historical epistemologyconstructivist epistemology, history and philosophy of science, philosophy of art, phenomenology, psychoanalysis, literary theory, education
| influences = Charles Nodier, Max Picard, Émile Meyerson, Auguste Comte, Abel Rey, Léon Brunschvicg, Carl Jung
| influenced = Alexandre Koyré, Georges Canguilhem, Michel Foucault, Louis Althusser, Gilles Deleuze, Pierre Bourdieu, Maurice Merleau-Ponty, Dominique Lecourt, Gilbert Durand, François Dagognet, Nader El-Bizri, Rogelio Salmona, Don Ihde, Cornelius Castoriadis, Michel Serres, Jules Vuillemin
| notable_ideas = Epistemological break, the poetics of space, rational materialism, technoscience(techno-science)Ihde, Don (1999) Expanding Hermeneutics: Visualism in Science, Northwestern University Press. p. 8. 
| signature = SignatureGastonBachelard.png
| signature_size = 100px
}}

Gaston Bachelard (27 June 1884 – 16 October 1962) was a French philosopher. He made contributions in the fields of poetics and the philosophy of science. To the latter, he introduced the concepts of epistemological obstacle and epistemological break (obstacle épistémologique and rupture épistémologique). He influenced many subsequent French philosophers, among them Michel Foucault, Louis Althusser, Dominique Lecourt and Jacques Derrida, as well as the sociologists Pierre Bourdieu and Bruno Latour.

For Bachelard, the scientific object should be constructed and therefore different from the positivist sciences; in other words, information is in continuous construction. Empiricism and rationalism are not regarded as dualism or opposition but complementary, therefore studies of a priori and a posteriori, or in other words reason and dialectic, are part of scientific research.

Life and work

Bachelard was a postal clerk in Bar-sur-Aube, and then studied physics and chemistry before finally becoming interested in philosophy. To obtain his doctorate (doctorat ès lettres) in 1927, he wrote two theses: the main one, Essai sur la connaissance approchée, under the direction of Abel Rey, and the complementary one, Étude sur l'évolution d'un problème de physique : la propagation thermique dans les solides, supervised by Léon Brunschvicg.

He first taught from 1902 to 1903 at the college of Sézanne, but turned away from teaching to consider a career in telegraphy. Literary by training, he took the technological path before moving towards science and mathematics. In particular, he was fascinated by the great discoveries of the end of the 19th century and the beginning of the 20th century (radioactivity, quantum and wave mechanics, relativity, electromagnetism and wireless telegraphy).

He was a professor at the University of Dijon from 1930 to 1940 and then was appointed chair in the history and philosophy of science at the University of Paris. In 1958, he became a member of the Royal Academy of Science, Letters and Fine Arts of Belgium.

 Bachelard's psychology of science 
Bachelard's studies of the history and philosophy of science in such works as Le nouvel esprit scientifique ("The New Scientific Spirit", 1934) and La formation de l'esprit scientifique ("The Formation of the Scientific Mind", 1938) were based on his vision of historical epistemology as a kind of psychoanalysis of the scientific mind.

In the English-speaking world, the connection Bachelard made between psychology and the history of science has been little understood. Bachelard demonstrated how the progress of science could be blocked by certain types of mental patterns, creating the concept of obstacle épistémologique ("epistemological obstacle"). One task of epistemology is to make clear the mental patterns at use in science, in order to help scientists overcome the obstacles to knowledge. Another goal is to “give back to human reason its function of agitation and aggressiveness” as Bachelard put it in ‘L'engagement rationaliste’ (1972).

 Epistemological breaks: the discontinuity of scientific progress 
Bachelard was critical of Auguste Comte's positivism, which considered science as a continual progress. To Bachelard, scientific developments such as Einstein's theory of relativity demonstrated the discontinuous nature of the history of sciences. Thus models that framed scientific development as continuous, such as that of Comte and Émile Meyerson, seemed simplistic and erroneous to Bachelard.

Through his concept of "epistemological break", Bachelard underlined the discontinuity at work in the history of sciences. However the term "epistemological break" itself is almost never used by Bachelard but became famous through Louis Althusser.

He showed that new theories integrated old theories in new paradigms, changing the sense of concepts (for instance, the concept of mass, used by Newton and Einstein in two different senses). Thus, non-Euclidean geometry did not contradict Euclidean geometry, but integrated it into a larger framework.

 Teacher and philosopher 
Discharged in March 1919 and unemployed, Bachelard searched and obtained a job in October as a professor of physics and chemistry at the college of Bar-sur-Aube. His wife, Jeanne Rossi, a schoolteacher he had married in 1914, was transferred to Voigny. His daughter Suzanne was born on 18 October. He travelled the six kilometers to Bar-sur-Aube on foot every day, was provided a very useful education, and enrolled for a philosophy degree. Jeanne died in June 1920, and Bachelard raised his daughter alone.
At the age of thirty-six he began a completely unexpected philosophical career. Starting decisively in 1922, he acquired the title of Doctor of Letters at the Sorbonne in 1927. His theses, supported by Abel Rey and Léon Brunschvicg, were published. He became a lecturer at the Faculty of Letters of Dijon from October 1927, but remained at the college of Bar-sur-Aube until 1930. He even participated in the municipal elections of 1929 to defend the project of a college for all. He nevertheless accepted a professorship at the University of Burgundy when his daughter Suzanne entered the second degree.

He did the same when he was appointed to the Sorbonne as a university professor and director of the Institute for the History of Science and Technology in 1940, accompanying his daughter in her higher educations.

On 25 August 1937 he was made a Knight of the Legion of Honor. He became a professor at the Sorbonne from 1940 to 1954. He held the chair of the history and philosophy of science, where he succeeded Abel Rey, director of the Institute of History and Philosophy of Science and Technology (IHST), which in 1992 became IHPST.

 The role of epistemology in science 

Bachelard was a rationalist in the Cartesian sense, although he recommended his "non-Cartesian epistemology" as a replacement for the more standard Cartesian epistemology. He compared "scientific knowledge" to ordinary knowledge in the way we deal with it, and saw error as only illusion: "Scientifically, one thinks truth as the historical rectification of a persistent error, and experiments as correctives for an initial, common illusion (illusion première)."

The role of epistemology is to show the history of the (scientific) production of concepts. Those concepts are not just theoretical propositions: they are simultaneously abstract and concrete, pervading technical and pedagogical activity. This explains why "The electric bulb is an object of scientific thought… an example of an abstract-concrete object." To understand the way it works, one has to take the detour of scientific knowledge. Epistemology is thus not a general philosophy that aims at justifying scientific reasoning. Instead, it produces regional histories of science.

 Shifts in scientific perspective 
Bachelard never saw how seemingly irrational theories often simply represented a drastic shift in scientific perspective. For instance, he never claimed that the theory of probabilities was just another way of complexifying reality through a deepening of rationality (even though critics like Lord Kelvin found this theory irrational).

One of his main theses in The New Scientific Mind was that modern sciences had replaced the classical ontology of the substance with an "ontology of relations", which could be assimilated to something like a process philosophy. For instance, the physical concepts of matter and rays correspond, according to him, to the metaphysical concepts of the thing and of movement; but whereas classical philosophy considered both as distinct, and the thing as ontologically real, modern science can not distinguish matter from rays. It is thus impossible to examine an immobile thing, which was precisely the condition for knowledge according to the classical theory of knowledge (Becoming being impossible to be known, in accordance with Aristotle and Plato's theories of knowledge).

In non-Cartesian epistemology, there is no "simple substance" as in Cartesianism, but only complex objects built by theories and experiments and continuously improved (VI, 4). Intuition is therefore not primitive, but built (VI, 2). These themes led Bachelard to support a sort of constructivist epistemology.

 Other academic interests 
In addition to epistemology, Bachelard's work deals with many other topics, including poetry, dreams, psychoanalysis, and the imagination. The Psychoanalysis of Fire (1938) and The Poetics of Space (1958) are among the most popular of his works: Jean-Paul Sartre cites the former and Bachelard's Water and Dreams in his Being and Nothingness (1943), and the latter had a wide reception in architectural theory circles, and continues to be influential in literary theory and creative writing. In philosophy, this nocturnal side of his work is developed by his student Gilbert Durand.

 Philosopher and citizen 
 Feminist philosopher 
It should be noted, in his singular career, the concern which he had to ensure the development of his daughter, so much the time was marked by the cleavage of the sexes and the functions. Going against sexist stereotypes, he wanted to make his daughter a scholar. Suzanne would be a mathematician and philosopher and would be able to develop phenomenological and epistemological research of high standing.

Bibliography
His works include:
 Essai sur la connaissance approchée (1928)
 Étude sur l'évolution d'un problème de physique: la propagation thermique dans les solides (1928)
 La valeur inductive de la relativité (1929)
 La pluralisme cohérent de la chimie moderne (1932)
 L'Intuition de l'instant (1932)
 Les intuitions atomistiques: essai de classification (1933)
 Le nouvel esprit scientifique (1934)
 La dialectique de la durée (1936)
 L'expérience de l'espace dans la physique contemporaine (1937)
 La formation de l'esprit scientifique: contribution à une psychanalyse de la connaissance objective (1938)
 La psychanalyse du feu (1938) (The Psychoanalysis of Fire, 1964)
 La philosophie du non: essai d'une philosophie du nouvel esprit scientifique (1940), publisher Pellicanolibri, 1978
 L'eau et les rêves (1942) (Water and Dreams, 1983)
 L'air et les songes (1943) (Air and Dreams, 1988)
 La terre et les rêveries de la volonté (1948) (Earth and Reveries of Will, 2002)
 La terre et les rêveries du repos (1948) (Earth and Reveries of Repose, 2011)
 Le Rationalisme appliqué (1949)
 L'activité rationaliste de la physique contemporaine (1951)
 Le matérialisme rationnel (1953)
 La poétique de l'espace (1957) (The Poetics of Space, 1969 and 2014)
 La poétique de la rêverie (1960) (The Poetics of Reverie: Childhood, Language, and the Cosmos, 1969)
 La flamme d'une chandelle (1961)
 L'engagement rationaliste (1972)

English translations
Though most of Bachelard's major works on poetics have been translated into English, only about half of his works on the philosophy of science have been translated.The Philosophy of No: A Philosophy of the New Scientific Mind. Orion Press, New York, 1968. Translation by G.C. Waterston. (La philosophie du non)The New Scientific Spirit. Beacon Press, Boston, 1985. Translation by A. Goldhammer. (Le nouvel esprit scientifique)Dialectic of Duration. Clinamen, Bolton, 2000. Translation by M. McAllester Jones. (La dialectique de la durée)The Formation of the Scientific Mind. Clinamen, Bolton, 2002. Translation by M. McAllester Jones. (La formation de l'esprit scientifique)
 Intuition of the Instant. Northwestern University Press, 2013. Translation by Eileen Rizo-Patron (L'intuition de l'instant)Atomistic Intuitions. State University of New York Press, 2018. Translation by Roch C. Smith (Intuitions atomistiques)

See also

References

 Sources 
 Dominique Lecourt, L’épistémologie historique de Gaston Bachelard (1969). Vrin, Paris, 11e édition augmentée, 2002.
 Dominique Lecourt, Pour une critique de l’épistémologie : Bachelard, Canguilhem, Foucault (1972, réed. Maspero, Paris, 5e éd. 1980).
 D. Lecourt, Marxism and Epistemology: Bachelard, Canguilhem and Foucault, New Left Books, London (1975).
 Dominique Lecourt, Bachelard, Epistémologie, textes choisis (1971). PUF, Paris, 6e édition, 1996.
 Dominique Lecourt, Bachelard, le jour et la nuit, Grasset, Paris, 1974.
 Didier Gil, Bachelard et la culture scientifique, Presses Universitaires de France, 1993.
 Didier Gil, Autour de Bachelard – esprit et matière, un siècle français de philosophie des sciences (1867–1962), Les Belles Lettres, Encre marine, 2010.Hommage à Gaston Bachelard. Etudes de philosophie et d'histoire des sciences, by C. Bouligand, G. Canguilhem, P. Costabel, F. Courtes, François Dagognet, M. Daumas, Gilles Granger, J. Hyppolite, R. Martin, R. Poirier and R. TatonActes du Colloque sur Bachelard de 1970 (Colloque de Cerisy).L'imaginaire du concept: Bachelard, une épistémologie de la pureté by Françoise Gaillard, MLN, Vol. 101, No. 4, French Issue (Sep 1986), pp. 895–911.Gaston Bachelard ou le rêve des origines, by Jean-Luc Pouliquen, L'Harmattan, Paris, 2007.

Further reading
 
 
McAllester Jones, Gaston Bachelard Subversive Humanist: Texts and Readings, University of Wisconsin Press, 1991.
Eileen Rizo-Patron, Edward S. Casey, and Jason Wirth, eds. Adventures in Phenomenology, Gaston Bachelard, State University of New York Press, 2017
Roch C. Smith, Gaston Bachelard, Philosopher of Science and Imagination, State University of New York Press, 2016
Mary Tiles, Bachelard: Science and Objectivity'', Cambridge University Press, 1984

External links

Website of the Association of Friends of Gaston Bachelard 
Centre Gaston Bachelard de Recherche sur l'Imaginaire et la Rationalité, Université de Bourgogne 
Works of Bachelard on-line 

1884 births
1962 deaths
20th-century French essayists
20th-century French male writers
20th-century French non-fiction writers
20th-century French philosophers
20th-century French poets
Architectural theoreticians
Architecture writers
Art writers
Chevaliers of the Légion d'honneur
Contemporary philosophers
Continental philosophers
Critical theorists
Epistemologists
Feminist theorists
French feminists
French literary theorists
French male essayists
French male non-fiction writers
French male poets
French military personnel of World War I
Historians of philosophy
Historians of science
Historians of technology
Literacy and society theorists
Male feminists
Members of the Royal Academy of Belgium
Metaphysicians
Metaphysics writers
Ontologists
People from Bar-sur-Aube
Phenomenologists
Philosophers of art
Philosophers of culture
Philosophers of education
Philosophers of history
Philosophers of literature
Philosophers of mathematics
Philosophers of mind
Philosophers of psychology
Philosophers of science
Philosophers of social science
Philosophers of technology
Philosophy academics
Rationalists
Rhetoric theorists
Rhetoricians
Social philosophers
Sociologists of science
Academic staff of the University of Burgundy
University of Paris alumni
Academic staff of the University of Paris